In the United States, the term trust fund recovery penalty refers to a tax penalty assessed against the directors or officers of a business entity which failed to pay a required tax on behalf of its employees.  The name derives from the fact that Social Security and Medicare taxes are paid into a trust fund which is used to pay out benefits under these programs.

Applicable law 

Section 6672 of the Internal Revenue Code provides that employers (rather than the employees themselves) must pay Social Security and Medicare taxes on their employees wages, as well as withhold a certain percentage of the wages and pay this withholding to the Internal Revenue Service.  If the employer is a business entity such as a corporation or a limited liability company, then any person who was "required to collect, truthfully account for, and pay over" the individual is liable "for a penalty equal to the total amount of tax" that went unpaid.  Once assessed, these "trust fund penalties" cannot be discharged in bankruptcy, and the taxpayer will be liable for them even if the business entity itself is liquidated.

Administration 

The Internal Revenue Service determines whom to assess the penalty against by conducting "trust fund penalty interviews" and filing a report using Form 4180.  Questions asked include the scope of the individual's role regarding the business and the means by which taxes such as payroll were dealt with and paid over.  Taxpayers unhappy with the result of the interview have the right to petition a court and be heard.

See also 
Payroll Tax
Piercing the corporate veil
Trust-fund tax
''Trust Fund Recovery Penalty'

United States federal taxation legislation
Withholding taxes